Lycée Eugène Delacroix may refer to:
 Lycée Eugène Delacroix in Drancy, Seine-Saint-Denis (Paris metropolitan area)
 Lycée Eugène Delacroix in Maisons-Alfort, Val-de-Marne (Paris metropolitan area)
 Lycée Franco-Hellénique Eugène Delacroix in Athens, Greece